Clivina aucta is a species of ground beetle in the subfamily Scaritinae. It was described by Wilhelm Ferdinand Erichson in 1843.

References

aucta
Beetles described in 1843